A partial solar eclipse will occur on February 18, 2091. A solar eclipse occurs when the Moon passes between Earth and the Sun, thereby totally or partly obscuring the image of the Sun for a viewer on Earth. A partial solar eclipse occurs in the polar regions of the Earth when the center of the Moon's shadow misses the Earth.

Related eclipses

Solar eclipses 2091–2094

References

External links 
 NASA graphics

2091 in science
2091 1 18
2091 1 18